Kavanad is a suburban area of Kollam Municipal Corporation in Kerala. It is a major market town located at the northern suburb of Kollam City in India. It is coming under Sakthikulangara zone of Kollam Municipal Corporation. It is just 3 km from the port town of Neendakara. Kavanad, a narrow strip of land sandwiched between the Arabian Sea and the Ashtamudi Lake has one of the highest land values in Kollam city.  The town emerged as a major shopping destination in Kollam with the advent of a number of  shopping centres. A number of  vehicle showrooms are also located at Kavanad-Ramankulangara-Mulamkadakam stretch. The long anticipated Kollam bypass starts just a kilometer before Kavanad from the place called Altharamoodu and was completed in January 2019, Kavanadu had become a major vantage point en route to Trivandrum from Alappuzha and is a fast developing satellite town within Kollam Metropolitan Area. You can also find 24 hr working shops in Kavanad which is a rarity in Kerala. Kavanadu is a major tourist attraction of Kollam
district.

HISTORY:
In 16 th century kavanadu called as  'kaval nadu' or 'kaval maadam' .At that period, about 2km radius is covered with 'kaav' , 'maadam' ,and surrounded with  Ashtamudi lake and Arabian sea . As time passes kaval naadu changes to kavanad. The main identity of this place is the market.
Neendakara and sakthikulangara harbour is a port where earlier, small traders came and sell the products. Lately these selling spread to kavanad as a small scale.    As years passed traders from southern side of kollam also came to kavanad which leds to the formation of kavanad market.

Geography
Kavanad is located at the southern tip of India and on the northern end of Kollam city Corporation, on the west coast and almost completely surrounded by water.

Location
It is on National Highway 66 between Kollam and Karunagappally. Nearest railway station is Kollam Junction Railway Station which is 5 km away.

Nearest airport is Thiruvananthapuram Airport around 75 km away.

School
Lake Ford School, St Mary's residential central school are the CBSE curriculum schools in Kavanadu.
Holy family convent Aravila, Government UP School Venkulangara, are the other schools in Kavanadu
vallikeezhu Girls Higher Secondary school is  one of the government schools with highest percentage of victory in the state.
Apart from these schools a lot of vocational training centres are also located in Kavanadu.

Economy
Kavanad has a flourishing fish and sea food export/processing industry, due to its proximity to the Arabian Sea and Ashtamudi Lake. Sreesatha temple, Muhiyudeen Masjid and Mukkad Holy Family Church are the major places of worship in Kavanad. Kavanad falls under the Kollam Corporation Circle. The people of kavanad majorly  occupied in  fishing related businesses. A lot of people also travels abroad to gulf countries for better prospects.
Kavanadu market is one of the biggest markets in Kollam district and a lot of people from other parts of Kollam come here to purchase fresh fish, meat, vegetables etc.

See also
 Kollam
 Kollam Port
 Kollam district
 Kollam Junction
 Kollam Beach
 Paravur
Poovanpuzha Temple

References

External links

Neighbourhoods in Kollam